William Pate Mulock,  (July 8, 1897 – August 25, 1954) was a Canadian politician.

Biography
William Pate Mulock was born in Toronto, Ontario, Canada, to William Mulock and Ethel Pate.

Mulock was educated at Upper Canada College and the University of Toronto, where he was a member of the Kappa Alpha Society. Following service in the Canadian Expeditionary Force in Siberia, he returned and attended Osgoode Hall Law School.

Mulock first ran unsuccessfully for the House of Commons of Canada in the riding of York North in the 1930 federal election. He was elected in a 1934 by-election and re-elected in 1935 and 1940. A Liberal, he was the Postmaster General from 1940 to 1945.

Upon the death of the founding publisher of the Toronto Star in 1948, Mulock inherited some of the estate of the late Joseph E. Atkinson. Mulock was the grandson of Sir William Mulock.

References

 

1897 births
1954 deaths
Liberal Party of Canada MPs
Members of the House of Commons of Canada from Ontario
Members of the King's Privy Council for Canada
Politicians from Toronto